The A22 is the principal motorway (freeway) in the Algarve, Portugal. Named after Henry the Navigator, it connects Lagos to Castro Marim and connects to the A-49 Motorway (Spain) on the Guadiana International Bridge over the Guadiana River. It is also part of European route E01.

The A22 is operated by Euroscut Algarve.

Construction on A22 began in 1991 and was completed in 2003.  It extends 133 km. As of 2011 it has become a toll road.

References

Motorways in Portugal
2003 establishments in Portugal